The Neighborhood is a 2016 novel by Mario Vargas Llosa. It was published on 3 March 2016 by Alfaguara in Spain, Latin America, and the United States.

Plot
Set in Lima in the 1990s during the presidency of Alberto Fujimori, the editor of the notorious tabloid Exposed, Rolando Garro, is found beaten and stabbed to death and his body left outside a gambling parlor. Enrique Cárdenas and Juan Peineta, both of whom had their reputations destroyed by Exposed, are suspected of killing Garro. Cárdenas was blackmailed by Garro to invest in his tabloid otherwise he would publish nude photos of Cárdenas. Cárdenas refused to meet the demands of Garro and had his reputation damaged when the photos were published. Peineta is a disgraced former television star and, before Garro's death, would send embittered letters to Exposed.

Title
The novel's title, refers to an area in the Barrios Altos neighborhood of the Lima District, where the story is set.

Reception
Kirkus Reviews called the novel a "colorful but confusing and ultimately disappointing work by a great writer."

Publishers Weekly gave the novel a rave review, calling it a "audacious and skillful" and comparing it to Thomas Pynchon's Inherent Vice.

Boyd Tonkin, writing for the Financial Times, largely praised the novel and saying it "pulses along with a zest and cunning not commonly found among octogenarian Nobel laureates" as well as calling it "punchily translated by the ever-excellent Edith Grossman."

Anthony Quinn of The Guardian felt the novel "never achieves a truly compulsive rhythm" and criticized Edith Grossman's translation for "tripping up" the reading experience.

References

2016 novels
Novels by Mario Vargas Llosa
Alfaguara books
Novels set in Lima
Novels with lesbian themes